Sebastian Treese (born 1977 in Mainz) is an architect from Germany based in Berlin. His architectural office is known for creating New Classical architecture that adapts to its urban surroundings, depending on context. Treese was awarded the renowned Driehaus Architecture Prize in 2021.

After finishing school in Osnabrück Treese studied architecture at the Berlin University of the Arts from 1997 to 2004. Among his mentors were Adolf Krischanitz, Hilmer & Sattler and Hans Kollhoff. He started his first architecture office in 2008 with Berlin-based architect Fritz Neumeyer (born 1977), before establishing Treese architects in 2011. He finished notable buildings like Eisenzahn 1 in Berlin, a private residence in Grunewald with Robert A. M. Stern, the Donkwall old town project in Kempen, the Elbchaussee 368 ensemble in Hamburg Nienstedten and Greifweg 14–16 in Düsseldorf-Oberkassel.

External links
Official website

References

Driehaus Architecture Prize winners
20th-century German architects
Architects from Berlin
Berlin University of the Arts alumni
21st-century German architects
New Classical architects
New Urbanism
1977 births
Living people